Radiate may refer to:

Biology
 Radiata, a taxon of jellyfish and allies
 Radiate carpal ligament, a group of fibrous bands in the hand
 Radiate ligament of head of rib
 Radiate sternocostal ligaments, fibrous bands in the sternum

Coins
Antoninianus, or "pre-reform radiate", a Roman silver coin issued in the 3rd century
Post-reform radiate, a Roman bronze coin issued in the 4th century

Music
 Radiate (album), by Tricia, 2013
 "Radiate" (Enter Shikari song), 2013
 "Radiate" (Jack Johnson song), 2013
 "Radiate", a song by Chemical Brothers from Born in the Echoes, 2015
 "Radiate", a song by Ex Hex from It's Real, 2019
 "Radiate", a song by Puddle of Mudd from Famous, 2007
 Radiate FM or WRGP, a student-run radio station of Florida International University in Miami, Florida

Other uses
 Radiation, a process by which energetic particles or energetic waves travel
 Radiate (app), a mobile social networking app
 Radiate crown, headgear symbolizing the sun

See also 
 Radial (disambiguation)